I, Joan is a play that premiered at Shakespeare's Globe in 2022. Written by Charlie Josephine and directed by Ilinca Radulian, the play is a retelling of the story of Joan of Arc.

Cast 
 Joan of Arc: Isobel Thom
 Charles: Jolyon Coy
 Marie: Janet Etuk
 Thomas: Adam Gillen
 Yolande: Debbie Korley
 Dunois: Jonah Russell

Themes 
Michelle Terry, the artistic director of Shakespeare's Globe stated that the play continued in Shakespeare's efforts to take "figures of the past to ask questions about the world around him" and to play "with identity, power, with the idea of pleasure, and with all sides of an argument."

Reception 
Anya Ryan  of The Guardian gave the play four out of five stars, saying that it was "performed with kinetic vigour" and was "a refined lesson in the trans experience: the horrors of having to explain your being, the sense of misplacement, but with beauty and wonder too." Isobel Lewis of The Independent also gave the play four stars, saying that it "makes nuanced, incredibly complex points about gender and the way the so-called “trans debate” has pitted trans and cis women against each other."

Claire Allfree of The Telegraph was more critical of the play, giving it two stars, saying that "the idea of Joan as trans is fertile subject for drama and discussion" but that the play "largely reduces the spiritual and political nature of Joan’s militaristic fervour to glib, empty proclamations."

See also 
 Cultural depictions of Joan of Arc

References 

LGBT-related plays
2022 plays
British plays
Transgender-related theatre
Works about Joan of Arc
Cultural depictions of Joan of Arc